The International Institute of Social Studies (ISS) of Erasmus University Rotterdam is an independent and international graduate school of policy-oriented critical social science. ISS was established in 1952 by Dutch universities and the Netherlands Ministry of Education. The institution is located in Netherlands, The Hague, also known as 'The World's Legal Capital'.

Between 300 and 400 students are enrolled in the ISS programmes, mostly in the Master and PhD programme in Development Studies. In addition to its teaching and research, ISS is active in the fields of advisory work and institutional capacity building projects. ISS alumni come from over 150 different countries.

History

ISS was founded in 1952 by the Dutch government to assist in the training and further education of professionals, especially, but not only, from developing countries. This was one way in which the Netherlands sought to develop good relationships with intellectuals and policy makers in partner countries, including and beyond former Dutch colonies.

Queen Juliana offered to house ISS in the Noordeinde Palace in The Hague in 1951. At first, ISS was perceived as a teaching institute, although by 1954 ISS was aiming to become research and teaching driven. Due to the role ISS played in creating the European Association of Development Institutes (EADI), and its focus on research and academic quality, the Institute received its formal rights to award the PhD in the 1970s. From 1993 onward, the ISS has been located in the former headquarters of the Netherlands Post and Telecommunications (the PTT) on the Kortenaerkade.

In 2009 ISS became part of Erasmus University Rotterdam. The partnership was carefully negotiated, due to ISS wanting to remain fairly autonomous and to retain its mission.

For many years, the main funding body for ISS Masters students was the Dutch government, through the NFP programme (now the OKP programme) administered by the Nuffic in cooperation with Dutch Embassies. ISS students have either OKP funding, another scholarship or private funding.

Academic profile

Programmes and degrees
ISS provides education in the social sciences to postgraduate professionals, mostly from developing countries and countries in transition. The courses are all taught in English and cover a number of different fields, including development economics, migration, public policy, governance, gender, agriculture, food, population, social security, children and youth, and human rights.

Doctoral programme 
The institute offers a four-year Doctoral programme which leads to a degree of Doctor of Philosophy in Development Studies. PhD researchers are embedded into the research programmes at ISS, and are usually involved in one of four research groups: Civic Innovation, Development Economics, Political Ecology or Governance, Law and Social Justice. Currently there are about 125 enrolled PhD researchers and ISS has awarded over 150 PhD degrees since the programme was established. Within the Netherlands, ISS participates in the national doctoral research school CERES, and within Erasmus University in the Erasmus Graduate School of Social Sciences and the Humanities.

Master programmes 
ISS offers a 15.5-month Master in Development Studies with various Majors and postgraduate diploma programmes; there is also a two-year joint master's degree in Public Policy which requires students to study at ISS or at the Central European University in the first academic year, and at the University of York or the Institute on International Relations in Barcelona (IBEI) in the second year.

The ISS Master's degree in Development Studies is accredited by the Netherlands Flemish accreditation organisation NVAO and provides eligibility for entry to PhD programmes in the Netherlands and other countries. In 2010 the ISS Master programme received the 'internationalization as a distinctive quality feature' accreditation from the NVAO.

ISS also offers various joint programmes with academic partners. In some programmes students take part of the programme elsewhere and part of the programme at ISS in The Hague. In other programmes ISS staff travel to the partner institute for contribute to teaching. Postgraduate diploma programmes are also offered catering to the needs of young and mid-career professionals who wish to deepen their knowledge in a particular field related to their research or occupation. All degrees are recognized internationally and by Dutch legislation on higher education.

Research and publications 
ISS research is clustered in the research programme Global Development and Social Justice. Much of the research carried out in the institute is available through publications online, either as journal articles or in the ISS Working Papers.

The ISS Working Paper series consists mainly of work in progress; the best, award-winning dissertations by Masters students are also published in this way. As well as seminars by staff and PhD participants, visiting researchers and invited experts come to speak at ISS on a regular basis. The wider diplomatic and academic community is often invited to major debates and other events.

Library
ISS has a specialised library available for the use of ISS staff and students and for visitors. The library focuses on the social sciences (development studies) with a predominant emphasis on developing countries and countries in transition. The collection comprises approximately 100,000 books, 450 current subscriptions to journals, a reference collection, as well as on-line and CD-ROM databases. The library also has a substantial collection of report material, much of it "grey" literature.

Rectors
Since its foundation the institute has had twelve rectors.
Egbert de Vries (1956–1966)
Jan Glastra van Loon (1966–1973)
Chris van Nieuwenhuyze (1973–1975)
Jos Hilhorst (1975–1976)
Louis Emmerij (1976–1985)
Charles Cooper (1985)
Dirk J (Dik) Wolfson (1986–1990)
Geertje Lycklama à Nijeholt (1990–1995)
Henk van Roosmalen (1995)
Hans Opschoor (1996–2004)
Louk de la Rive Box (2005–2010)
Leo de Haan (2010-2015)
Inge Hutter (since 2015)

ISS Alumni
Over 13,000 students from more than 160 countries have studied at ISS. These former students create the international ISS alumni community.

Notable alumni
 Raqiya Haji Dualeh Abdalla
 Zoran Jolevski
 Dr. David Francis 
 Samuel Kofi Woods
 Marietta Brew Appiah-Oppong
 Ramji Raghavan
 Kasit Piromya
 Tarik Ahsan
 Rafael Pardo Rueda
 Teferra Wolde-Semait
 Ashok Mitra

Notable honorary Fellows

 Dattatreya Gopal Karve 1962
 Peter Kuenstler 1962
 Oskar Lange 1962
 Eugen Pusić 1962
 Paul Rosenstein-Rodan 1962
 Jan Tinbergen 1962
 Hans Singer 1977
 Raúl Prebisch 1977
 Manfred Lachs 1982
 Amartya Sen 1982

 Rodolfo Stavenhagen 1982
 Prince Claus of the Netherlands 1988
 Subrata Roy Chowdhury 1992
 Hans Linneman 1992
 Benno Ndulu 1997
 Mamphela Ramphele 1997
 Jan Pronk 2002
 Elinor Ostrom 2002
 Edward Said 2002
 Martha Nussbaum 2006
 Richard Jolly 2007
 Bina Agarwal 2007
 Jan Breman 2009
 Robert Chambers 2013

References

Notes

External links
International Institute of Social Studies
Map location

 
Erasmus University Rotterdam
Educational institutions established in 1952